William Spence (June 9, 1906 – May 30, 1929) was an American racecar driver. He was killed in the 1929 Indianapolis 500 after making contact with the inside wall in turn 2. This accident was caught on film by the makers of the 1929 silent film Speedway and the horrific crash can be seen in the last reel. In the captured film, Spence's front right tire hits the inside wall, indicating the car has previously spun. The car then rotates counterclockwise, and the right side appears to hit a rut or indentation in the track, causing the car to flip, landing upside down. Spence suffered a fractured skull.

Spence also served as a relief driver in the 1928 Indianapolis 500 for Billy Arnold.

Indianapolis 500 results

References

See also
List of Indianapolis fatalities

American racing drivers
Racing drivers who died while racing
Indianapolis 500 drivers
Sports deaths in Indiana
1906 births
1929 deaths
Filmed deaths in motorsport
Racing drivers from Los Angeles